Ár n-Éire New Ireland was an Irish Nationalist weekly newspaper published between 1915 and 1922. It was edited by Patrick Little who edited An Phobalcht and became a Fianna Fail TD.

It was published from 13 Fleet Street, Dublin, and published during the 1916 Rising. The author and future editor of the Irish Press Frank Gallagher worked as a journalist for the New Ireland. Others who made contributions to the content of the New Ireland included James McNeill (brother of Eoin, and second Governor-General of the Irish Free State) and Laurence Patrick Byrne. The paper would have supported the Irish Parliamentary Party but became more pro-Sinn Féin as time went on. The paper supported a number of charity initiatives such as the Dublin Infant Aid Society.

References

1915 establishments in Ireland
1922 disestablishments in Ireland
Defunct newspapers published in Ireland
Defunct weekly newspapers
Publications established in 1915
Publications disestablished in 1922